Louis' Lunch is a hamburger restaurant in New Haven, Connecticut, which claims to be the first restaurant to serve hamburgers and the oldest hamburger restaurant in the United States. It was opened as a small lunch wagon in 1895 and was one of the first places in the U.S. to serve steak sandwiches. According to Louis' Lunch, the hamburger was created in 1900 in response to a customer's hurried request for a lunch to go. In 1917, Louis moved the business into a square-shaped brick building that had once been a tannery.

In 1975, the restaurant was moved four blocks down to 263 Crown Street. Hamburgers cooked in the restaurant are made on the original cast iron vertical gas broilers from 1898, and the toast is made in a 1929 Savory Appliance Radiant Gas Toaster. The building is a New Haven landmark.

History

Louis Lassen was born Ludvig Lassen on July 30, 1865 in Ballum parish. The parish was part of a region in the Kingdom of Denmark which was lost in the 1864 war between Denmark and Austria-Prussia.  The peace treaty in Vienna was signed in October 1864; thus, Ballum parish was German at the time of Lassen's birth the following summer. Part of the region and thus Ballum parish became part of (Southern Jutland) in Denmark again in 1920.

He and his Ohio-born wife Sophhia nee Kurtz (1862–1941) were married in Manhattan, New York City on May 25, 1889.  The couple had one daughter and four sons between 1891 and 1903. 

Ludvig aka Louis Lassen died on March 20, 1935 in New Haven, New Haven County, Connecticut.  He and his wife are buried at Evergreen Cemetery in New Haven. 

Lassen was a "blacksmith by trade and preacher by vocation" and immigrated to New Haven from Denmark in 1881. 

His parents Christopher Christian Lassen (1823–1901), a blacksmith, and Anna Maria nee Christensen (1830–1902) immigrated with their youngest daughter Hannah to the U.S. in 1882, and also settled in New Haven County, Connecticut.

He became a food peddler, selling butter and eggs from a wooden cart. He purchased a home at 45 Elliot Street and stored his cart in a shed in the backyard. In 1895, he began adding lunch items to his cart.

A local businessman dashed into the small New Haven lunch wagon one day in 1900, and he pleaded for a lunch to go. According to the Lassen family, the customer exclaimed "Louie! I'm in a rush, slap a meatpuck between two planks and step on it!". Lassen placed his own blend of ground steak trimmings between two slices of toast and sent the gentleman on his way, so the story goes, with America's alleged first hamburger being served. 

In 1917, Lassen moved into a square brick building that had once been a tannery. Louis' Lunch was forced to move to make way for development in 1975, so it moved two blocks down to 263 Crown Street in New Haven. In the 1950s, Ken Lassen added cheese spread to the hamburger. The fourth generation of Lassens owns and operates Louis' Lunch today.

Operations 
The Louis' Lunch menu consists of "The Burger," potato salad, potato chips, and homemade pie. Louis' Lunch makes their hamburger sandwiches from ground steak made from a blend of five cuts of beef. The hamburgers are then flame broiled vertically. The hamburgers are prepared with cheese, tomato or onion, then served on two square pieces of toasted white bread.

Louis' Lunch flame broils the hamburgers in the original cast iron vertical gas broilers manufactured by the Bridge and Beach, Co., St. Louis, Missouri, in 1898. The stoves use hinged steel wire gridirons to hold the hamburgers in place while they cook simultaneously on both sides. The gridirons were made by Luigi Pieragostini and patented in 1938. A sharp cheese spread is used, as opposed to sliced cheese. The restaurant uses a 1929 Savory Radiant Gas Toaster.

The restaurant is traditionally closed during the month of August (for vacation). In 2014, Louis' Lunch was closed from August 3 to September 1.

Hamburger claims 

Many others claim to be the creator of the hamburger, including Charlie Nagreen, brothers Frank and Charles Menches, Oscar Weber Bilby, and Fletcher Davis. White Castle traces the origin of the hamburger to Hamburg, Germany, with its invention by Otto Kuase. However, it gained national recognition at the 1904 St. Louis World's Fair when the New-York Tribune namelessly attributed the hamburger as "the innovation of a food vendor on the pike."

In 2000, the Library of Congress recognized Louis' Lunch as the creator of the hamburger after being backed by United States Representative Rosa L. DeLauro. The Library of Congress stated that Louis Lassen sold the first hamburger and steak sandwich in the U.S. in 1900. New York magazine states, "The dish actually had no name until some rowdy sailors from Hamburg named the meat on a bun after themselves years later," noting also that this claim is subject to dispute.

Detractors of the Louis' Lunch claim include Josh Ozersky, a food editor for New York Magazine. In Ozersky's book, The Hamburger: A History, Ozersky denies the claim based on the definition of a hamburger and told the New Haven Register, "If you say it can be on toast, you're essentially redefining the hamburger out of existence. The hamburger as the world knows it means a sandwich of ground beef on a bun." However, Motz's Hamburger America notes that the hamburger bun did not exist in 1900 nor did so for another 20 years. Ozersky's book also notes earlier claimants and recognizes Walter Anderson for creating the modern hamburger.

In 2006, a "mock trial" was held by the Hamburger Festival in Akron, Ohio. Louis' Lunch was noted to have taken the event seriously, in contrast to other representatives of other hamburger creator claimants. Renny Loisel, public relations director of the Greater New Haven Convention and Visitors Bureau, submitted an affidavit and letter from the New Haven Preservation Trust and noted that the Library of Congress recognizes Louis' Lunch for creating the first hamburger, but the evidence was denied. According to an internet poll, Louis' Lunch placed third and Loisel noted that despite the evidence it was more about theatrics than truth.

An article from ABC News sums up the problems of identifying the origins of the hamburger by stating, "One problem is that there is little written history. Another issue is that the spread of the burger happened largely at the World's Fair, from tiny vendors that came and went in an instant. And it is entirely possible that more than one person came up with the idea at the same time in different parts of the country."

Reception 
The restaurant has been the subject of shows on "the Travel Channel, the Food Network, the History Channel and even Oprah." On Travel Channel's Chowdown Countdown, Louis' Lunch was rated #1. Episode 10 of Burger Land, A Burger is Born, highlights the claim and history of Louis' Lunch. According to Raichlen's book, BBQ USA, patrons of Louis' Lunch include United States presidents George H. W. Bush and George W. Bush, Charles Lindbergh, and Artie Shaw. Food & Wine's website named Louis' Lunch as one of the "Best Burgers in the U.S." Roadfood notes that it is an "essential stop on America's burger trail."

Critics of the restaurant hinge on its dislike of condiments, particularly ketchup; customers who ask for it are ejected from the premises. In episode 10 of Burger Land, the "no ketchup" sign is visible hanging in the restaurant and an informative caption pops up to read "Yale students who try to sneak in ketchup are asked to leave." According to "American Food Roots," signage and an exchange of stories confirms the policy. Tom Gilbert wrote, "Louis’ Lunch is a very friendly place as long as you get with the program, which always has been about serving quality beef and making sure that nothing ruins or upstages it. As Jeff [Lassen] will tell you, that means no puffy, sweet bun, no well-done meat and no ketchup..." Both Connecticut Museum Quest and American Food Roots note the strong presence for the restaurant's way and Menuism goes so far as to note it the #2 of "the 5 Least Welcome Places for Ketchup." Even Esquire affirms, "You can get your hamburger sandwich topped with onions, tomato, and a squirt of Cheez-Wiz. Just don't ask for anything else." On the wall a sign reads "this is not Burger King you can't "have it your way." You get it my way or you can't have it."

See also
List of the oldest restaurants in the United States
History of the hamburger
History of the hamburger in the United States
List of hamburger restaurants

References

External links

Hamburgers (food)
Restaurants in Connecticut
Hamburger restaurants in the United States
Tourist attractions in New Haven, Connecticut
Restaurants established in 1895
Buildings and structures in New Haven, Connecticut
Economy of New Haven, Connecticut
1895 establishments in Connecticut